Singi Station is a station on Daegu Subway Line 1 in Singi-dong, Dong District, Daegu, South Korea.

External links 
 DTRO virtual station

Dong District, Daegu
Daegu Metro stations
Railway stations opened in 1998